The 1993 Ottawa Rough Riders finished 3rd place in the East Division with a 4–14 record. They were defeated in the East Semi-Final by the Hamilton Tiger-Cats.

Offseason

CFL draft

Preseason

Regular season

Season standings

Regular season

Schedule

Postseason

Awards and honours

1993 CFL All-Stars
None

References

Ottawa Rough Riders seasons